Borghese Petrucci was an Italian politician, who ruled the Republic of Siena from 1512 to 1516.

Early life and family
Petrucci was born in Siena in 1490, eldest son of Pandolfo Petrucci and Aurelia Borghese, daughter of Niccolò Borghese and brother of Cardinal Alfonso Petrucci. Borghese was presumably named in honor of his maternal grandfather.

Ruler of Siena
He does not appear in the sources with official duties until on 6 February 1512, when his father, now ill and near death, decided to make him the city's ruler. The death of Pandolfo occurred May 21, 1512 and Borghese became the "Primus" of Siena and Monte dei Nove. Favored in government by his brother Alfonso, the Cardinal of Saint Theodore, he exercised the functions of government in a confrontation between the Kingdom of Spain and the Republic of Venice. He was an ally of the Kingdom of France, after the agreements concluded at Blois in 1513. Upon election of Giovanni de Medici as Pope Leo X, Petrucci tried to maintain Siena's independence allying with the Kingdom of Spain in 1511.

1516 coup
Siena was wedged between the Republic of Florence and the Papal States, and maintained ties between Petrucci and the Baglioni of Perugia. Leo X, unable to occupy the territories directly, facilitated a coup on 8 March 1516, by Raffaello Petrucci, Bishop of Grosseto and lord of Castel S. Angelo.

Banishment
Borghese Petrucci was banished from Siena in May 1516 and moved to Naples, where, in the years following, he was named Baron. The date of his death is unknown.

References
Gattoni M., Pandolfo Petrucci and foreign policy of the Republic of Siena (1487–1512), Siena, 1997 Cantagalli
Gattoni M., Leo X and the geo-politics of the Papal States (1513–1521), Vatican City, Vatican Archives Collectanea (47), 2000;
Gattoni M., Siena and giants. The clash between France and Spain in Lombardy in the letters of Aldello Placidi, orator in Rome, Siena (1513–1515), in Bulletin of National History Senese CIV (1997), p. 377-402;
Gattoni M., Siena and Spanish dominance. The legation of Alessandro Borghesi Raimondo Cardona, Viceroy of Naples (September–October 1512), in Bulletin of the History Senese country, CII (1995), p. 464-481;
Lusini V., of a document concerning Raphael Petrucci, castellan of Castel S. Angel in Siena Bulletin of National History, The (1894), p. 117-123;
Mengozzi N., Cardinal Raphael Petrucci of Siena, in Siena Bulletin of National History, XX (1913), p. 147-157;
Terziani R., The Government of Siena from Medieval to Modern. Continuity Republican at the time of Petrucci (1487–1525) by Betti Publishing, Siena, 2002, reprinted 2006;
I. Ugurgieri-Azzolini, pumps Siena, Pistoia 1649

1490 births
Year of death missing
Politicians from Siena
Lords of Italy
Borghese